The Roman Catholic Archdiocese of Palmas is an archdiocese located in the city of Palmas in Brazil.

History
 March 27, 1996: Established as Metropolitan Archdiocese of Palmas from the Diocese of Miracema do Tocantins and Diocese of Porto Nacional

Leadership
 Archbishops of Palmas (Roman rite), in reverse chronological order
 Archbishop Pedro Brito Guimarães (2010.10.20 - present)
 Archbishop Alberto Taveira Corrêa (1996.03.27 – 2009.12.30), appointed Archbishop of Belém do Pará

Suffragan dioceses
 Diocese of  Araguaína
 Diocese of Cristalândia
 Diocese of Miracema do Tocantins 
 Diocese of Porto Nacional
 Diocese of Tocantinópolis

Sources
 GCatholic.org
 Catholic Hierarchy
  Archdiocese website (Portuguese)

Roman Catholic dioceses in Brazil
Roman Catholic ecclesiastical provinces in Brazil
 
Christian organizations established in 1996
Roman Catholic dioceses and prelatures established in the 20th century
1996 establishments in Brazil